McComb station is a train station in McComb, Mississippi, United States, serving Amtrak's City of New Orleans passenger train. This is a flag stop, and trains only stop if passengers have tickets to and from the station.
On May 30, 2021, the station suffered a catastrophic fire and was believed to be a total loss.  However, after the structure was inspected by an architectural firm, as well as two construction contractors experienced in rehabilitating burned structures, it was determined in November, 2021, that most of the depot's walls could be saved in the central area and southern ends of the building.  On January 3, 2022, Pike Construction of Mississippi, LLC began the rebuilding process, which is expected to take 9-12 months to complete.

History
The station was built in 1901 by the Illinois Central Railroad and was restored in 1998, and again on June 13, 2003. The station house is currently the home of the McComb Railroad Museum. It also houses the waiting room for Amtrak passengers.

References

External links

 McComb Amtrak Station (USA Rail Guide -- Train Web)
 McComb City Railroad Depot Museum

Amtrak stations in Mississippi
Buildings and structures in Pike County, Mississippi
Former Illinois Central Railroad stations
Railway stations in the United States opened in 1901
Railroad museums in Mississippi
Museums in Pike County, Mississippi
McComb, Mississippi